Bella Rochel Fraynd (27 August 1911 – 12 February 1994), known as Rahela Ferari, was a Serbian actress who appeared in more than ninety films from 1951 to 1993. She was of Ashkenazi (Jewish) origin.

Selected filmography

References

External links 

1911 births
1994 deaths
People from Zemun
Actresses from Belgrade
Serbian film actresses
Serbian Ashkenazi Jews
Yugoslav film actresses
Laureates of the Ring of Dobrica